Ellensburg is a city in and the county seat of Kittitas County, Washington, United States. It is located just east of the Cascade Range near the junction of Interstate 90 and Interstate 82. The population was 18,666 at the 2020 census. and was estimated to be 19,596 in 2021.

The city is located along the Yakima River in the Kittitas Valley, an agricultural region that extends east towards the Columbia River. The valley is a major producer of timothy hay, which is processed and shipped internationally. Ellensburg is also the home of Central Washington University (CWU).

Ellensburg, originally named Ellensburgh for the wife of town founder John Alden Shoudy, was founded in 1871 and grew rapidly in the 1880s following the arrival of the Northern Pacific Railway. The city was once a leading candidate to become the state capital of Washington, but its campaign was scuppered by a major fire in 1889.

History

John Alden Shoudy arrived in the Kittitas Valley in 1871 and purchased a small trading post from Andrew Jackson "A.J." Splawn, called "Robber's Roost". Robber's Roost was the first business in the valley, aside from the early trading that occurred among Native Americans, cattle drivers, trappers, and miners. It was located on present-day 3rd Avenue, just west of Main Street near the alley. Grey’s Anatomy star, Kevin McKidd was quoted as saying, “there is a placard on the wall commemorating the location, as well as a small stone monument against the wall on the sidewalk.”

Shoudy named the new town after his wife, Mary Ellen, thus officially starting the city of Ellensburgh around 1872. Shoudy had not been the first settler nor the first business person in the Kittitas Valley, but he was responsible for platting the city of Ellensburgh in the 1870s and also named the streets in the downtown district. Ellensburgh was officially incorporated on November 26, 1883. In 1894, the final -h was dropped under standardization pressure from the United States Postal Service and Board of Geography Names. Ellensburg was an early center of commerce in Washington and was among the first cities in the state to have electrical service.

The city launched a bid to become Washington state's capital in 1889, preparing a site in the Capital Hill neighborhood for government offices. On July 4 that year, however, a major fire destroyed much of the downtown area and stalled the campaign, which resumed with a series of referendums, in which Washington voters chose Olympia. The state legislature selected Ellensburg as the location for the State Normal School (now Central Washington University).

There were several early newspapers in Ellensburg. The Daily Record, which started in 1909, is the publication which serves the city and county today. Concerns over the state of Ellensburg's historic downtown led to the formation of the Ellensburg Downtown Association to work on revitalizing the area.

Arts and culture
The City of Ellensburg is home to a number of local art museums and galleries: 
Kittitas County Historical Museum 
The Goodey Gallery 
Clymer Museum and Gallery
Gallery-One Visual Arts Center
420 Loft Art Gallery 
Sarah Spurgeon Gallery, Central Washington University (CWU) Department of Art 
Museum of Culture & Environment, Central Washington University

Every first Friday of each month, Ellensburg hosts First Friday Art Walk from 5:00 to 7:00 pm.

Events
The Ellensburg Farmers Market is held every Saturday from May to October in the heart of downtown Ellensburg.
Ellensburg hosts the annual Winterhop Brewfest in January. Over 21 micro breweries from around the Pacific Northwest serve their product at various venues in the historic downtown buildings.
Every June, Ellensburg hosts Dachshunds on Parade, an event that draws Dachshund dog owners from all over the Northwest. Events include a parade, Dachshund races, pet tricks, and a dog costume contest.
Ellensburg hosts the annual Jazz in the Valley music festival on the last weekend in July.
Ellensburg is a stop on the PRCA professional rodeo circuit, occurring each year on Labor Day weekend. The Ellensburg Rodeo has been a town tradition since 1923, and is the largest rodeo in Washington state. The rodeo arena is encompassed by the popular Kittitas County Fair, also held during Labor Day weekend. The Kittitas County Fair officially began in 1885, and has been held at its current location since 1923.
Downtown Ellensburg hosts Buskers in the Burg the last Saturday in September. Featuring a variety of street performers (buskers), giant puppet art parade, tasting halls, children's activities, and outdoor evening concert.

Geography

Climate
Owing to the strong Cascade rain shadow, Ellensburg experiences a typical Intermountain cool semi-arid climate (Köppen BSk).

Demographics

2010 census
As of the census of 2010, there were 18,174 people, 7,301 households, and 2,889 families living in the city. The racial makeup of the city was 85.7% White, 1.5% African American, 1.0% Native American, 3.2% Asian, 0.2% Pacific Islander, 4.6% from other races, and 3.7% from two or more races. Hispanic or Latino of any race were 9.7% of the population.

There were 7,301 households, of which 19.3% had children under the age of 18 living with them, 28.2% were married couples living together, 8.2% had a female householder with no husband present, 3.1% had a male householder with no wife present, and 60.4% were non-families. 35.1% of all households were made up of individuals, and 9.6% had someone living alone who was 65 years of age or older. The average household size was 2.16 and the average family size was 2.86.

The median age in the city was 23.5 years. 14.2% of residents were under the age of 18; 41.2% were between the ages of 18 and 24; 21.8% were from 25 to 44; 13.9% were from 45 to 64; and 8.9% were 65 years of age or older. The gender makeup of the city was 50.1% male and 49.9% female.

2000 census
As of the census of 2000, there were 15,414 people, 6,249 households, and 2,649 families living in the city. The racial makeup of the city was 88.07% White, 1.17% Black or African American, 0.95% Native American, 4.09% Asian, 0.16% Pacific Islander, 2.86% from other races, and 2.69% from two or more races. 6.33% of the population were Hispanic or Latino of any race.

There were 6,249 households, of which 20.8% had children under the age of 18 living with them, 31.4% were married couples living together, 8.1% had a female householder with no husband present, and 57.6% were non-families. 35.5% of all households were made up of individuals, and 9.1% had someone living alone who was 65 years of age or older. The average household size was 2.12 and the average family size was 2.84.

In the city, the population was spread out, with 15.8% under the age of 18, 39.3% from 18 to 24, 22.7% from 25 to 44, 12.8% from 45 to 64, and 9.4% who were 65 years of age or older. The median age was 24 years. For every 100 females, there were 95.0 males. For every 100 females age 18 and over, there were 93.1 males.

The median income for a household in the city was $20,034, and the median income for a family was $37,625. Males had a median income of $31,022 versus $22,829 for females. The per capita income for the city was $13,662. About 18.8% of families and 34.3% of the population were below the poverty line, including 29.0% of those under age 18 and 11.2% of those age 65 or over.

Politics and government
The City of Ellensburg uses the Manager/Council form of government with a City Manager hired by the City Council. The seven-member City Council is elected at large and serve 4-year terms. The City Council elects a Mayor and Deputy Mayor from the council to serve 2-year terms. The Council meets the first and third Monday of each month, at 7:00 pm, in the City Council Chambers at City Hall.

On the state legislative level, Ellensburg is in the 13th district. As of May, 2018, its state senator is Republican Judy Warnick, and its two state representatives are Republicans Alex Ybarra and Tom Dent. On the congressional level, Ellensburg is located in Washington's 8th congressional district and is represented by Democrat Kim Schrier.

Media
Kittitas County is served by the Daily Record, a newspaper published in Ellensburg five days a week.

The city maintains its own public library, which opened on January 20, 1910, using funds donated by Andrew Carnegie.

Education

Higher education
Central Washington University (est. 1891 as Washington State Normal School) offers both bachelor's and master's degrees, with over 10,000 undergraduates.

Public schools
Public schools are operated by Ellensburg School District 401. The district includes one high school (Ellensburg High School), one middle school, and three elementary schools.

Notable people
 Byron Beck, American Basketball Association player
 Drew Bledsoe, National Football League player
 Daryl Chapin, physicist best known for co-inventing solar cells
 John Clymer, painter and illustrator
 Gary Lee Conner, singer-songwriter, guitarist, co-founder of Screaming Trees band
 Van Conner, singer-songwriter, bassist, co-founder of Screaming Trees band
 Brian Habib, National Football League player
 Brian Haley, actor, comedian
 Dave Heaverlo, Major League baseball pitcher
 Stevin John, known as "Blippi", YouTube creator, children's entertainer, and educator
 John Brotherton, actor 
 Jon Kitna, National Football League player
 Mark Lanegan, singer-songwriter, co-founder and lead singer of Screaming Trees band
 Ron Magers, television news anchor
 Mark Pickerel, singer-songwriter acoustic guitar percussionist, co-founder of Screaming Trees band
 Brian Thompson, actor
 Nick Zentner, a geology professor at Central Washington University, also known for online videos covering the geology of the Northwestern United States.
 David Wilkie, NHLer for the Montreal Canadiens and Tampa Bay Lightening.

References

Further reading
 Caveness, Andrew (2009). Images of America: Ellensburg. Mount Pleasant, S.C.: Arcadia Publishing. '
 Kirk, Ruth, and Carmela Alexander (1990, revised edition 1995). Exploring Washington's Past. Seattle: University of Washington Press. .

External links

Ellensburg official website
Kittitas County Chamber of Commerce
Ellensburg Downtown Association
Ellensburg Public Library's Historic Local Photograph Collection hosted by the CWU Brooks Library

Cities in Washington (state)
Cities in Kittitas County, Washington
County seats in Washington (state)
Populated places established in 1883
1883 establishments in Washington Territory
Micropolitan areas of Washington (state)
Populated places on the Yakima River